William Nelson "Pop" Golden (July 3, 1868 – August 31, 1949) was an American football and baseball coach.  He served as the head football coach at Pennsylvania State University from 1900 to 1902, compiling a record of 16–12–1.  Golden was also the head baseball coach at Penn State from 1903 to 1906, tallying a mark of 50–24–1. He was born in 1868 in Athens, Ohio. He died after a brief illness in 1949.

Head coaching record

Football

References

External links
 

1868 births
1949 deaths
Penn State Nittany Lions athletic directors
Penn State Nittany Lions baseball coaches
Penn State Nittany Lions football coaches
People from Athens, Ohio